Luigi Maria Bossi (Malnate, 30 December 1859 – Milan, 1 February 1919) was a gynecologist and Italian politician.
He was director of the Institute of Obstetrics in Novara and of a Genoese clinic.
In 1898, in Genoa, he operated on Constance Lloyd, the wife of Oscar Wilde, who died a few days after the operation.
He was elected to Parliament for the Italian Socialist Party in the twenty-first Legislature of the Kingdom of Italy (1900-1904).
He was assassinated by the husband of a patient  for "a grossly unethical personal relationship with a patient".

References

1859 births
1919 deaths
19th-century Italian physicians
20th-century Italian physicians
Assassinated Italian politicians
Italian gynaecologists